The following lists events that happened during 1958 in Australia.

Incumbents

Monarch – Elizabeth II
Governor-General – Sir William Slim
Prime Minister – Robert Menzies
Chief Justice – Sir Owen Dixon

State premiers
Premier of New South Wales – Joseph Cahill
Premier of Queensland – Frank Nicklin
Premier of South Australia – Thomas Playford IV
Premier of Tasmania – Robert Cosgrove (until 26 August), then Eric Reece
Premier of Victoria – Henry Bolte
Premier of Western Australia – Albert Hawke

State governors
Governor of New South Wales – Sir Eric Woodward
Governor of Queensland – Sir Henry Abel Smith (from 18 March)
Governor of South Australia – Sir Robert George
Governor of Tasmania – Sir Ronald Cross, 1st Baronet (until 4 June)
Governor of Victoria – Sir Dallas Brooks
Governor of Western Australia – Sir Charles Gairdner

Events
 14 January – Qantas Airways introduces a round-the-world air service from Australia to London.
 20 January – The Royal Australian Naval College is moved back to Jervis Bay Territory from Flinders Naval Depot in Victoria.
 28 January to 11 February – Harold Macmillan visits Australia, the first Prime Minister of the United Kingdom to do so while in office.
 14 February to 7 March – Queen Elizabeth The Queen Mother visits Australia for the second time.
 21 March – John McEwen replaces Arthur Fadden as federal leader of the Country Party.
 24 March – The Cahill Expressway in Sydney opens, the first true freeway in Australia.
 3 April – A cyclone destroys most of the town of Bowen in Queensland.
 15 April – Monash University is founded in Melbourne, Victoria.
 11 May – Construction of Australia's largest man-made lake, Lake Eucumbene on the Eucumbene River in the Snowy Mountains, is completed.
 31 May – Henry Bolte's Liberal government is re-elected in Victoria.
 19 July – The last tram service runs in Perth.
 26 August – Robert Cosgrove retires as Premier of Tasmania, and is replaced by Eric Reece.
 30 September – The ANZAC Day Act 1958 receives Royal Assent, making ANZAC Day (25 April) a national public holiday in Australia.
 26 October – The wreckage of the Australian National Airways Avro 10 aircraft, VH-UMF Southern Cloud, is found. The aircraft had been missing since 1931.
 22 November – A federal election is held. The Liberal-Country coalition led by Robert Menzies defeats H. V. Evatt's Australian Labor Party with 74 seats to 45 in the House of Representatives, a majority unprecedented since Federation, gained from preferences from the Democratic Labor Party.

Unknown dates
 Aquila Shoes, a shoe manufacturing company, founded. 
 Johnny O'Keefe has his first hit with Wild One.
 Radio station 2UE publishes the first Australian Top 40.

Science and technology
 26 January – The HIFAR nuclear reactor at Lucas Heights goes critical for the first time.

Unknown dates
 Australian engineer Dr. David Warren of Melbourne's Aeronautical Research Laboratories constructs the world's first flight recorder ("black box").

Arts and literature

 11 December – The National Institute of Dramatic Art (NIDA) opens in Sydney.
 William Edwin Pidgeon wins the Archibald Prize with his portrait of journalist Ray Walker 
 Eric Smith wins the Blake Prize for Religious Art with his work The Moment Christ Died
 Randolph Stow wins the Miles Franklin Award for To the Islands
 Russel Ward releases The Australian Legend

Film
 8 March - The film Bridge on the River Kwai was released in Sydney.

Television
 October - Autumn Affair, first television soap opera produced in Australia debuts
 1 November – The first episode of Bandstand goes to air on TCN-9, hosted by Brian Henderson.
 22 November – The 1958 Australian federal election is the first to be televised.

Sport
 Athletics
 23 March – John Russell wins his second men's national marathon title, clocking 2:40:30 in Sydney
 6 August – Herb Elliott sets a world record for the one-mile dash (3:54.5) at Morton Stadium in Dublin, Ireland.
 Cricket
 New South Wales wins the Sheffield Shield
 Football
Brisbane Rugby League premiership: Brothers defeated Valleys 22-7
 New South Wales Rugby League premiership: St. George defeated Western Suburbs 20-9
WAFL East Perth defeated East Fremantle 65 - 63
South Australian National Football League premiership: won by Port Adelaide
Victorian Football League premiership: Collingwood defeated Melbourne 82-64
 Golf
 Australian Open: won by Gary Player
 Horse Racing
 Sir Blink wins the Caulfield Cup
 Yeman wins the Cox Plate
 Skyline wins the Golden Slipper
 Baystone wins the Melbourne Cup
 Motor Racing
 The Australian Grand Prix was held at Bathurst and won by Lex Davison driving a Ferrari
 Tennis
 Australian Open men's singles: Ashley Cooper defeats Malcolm Anderson 7–5 6–3 6–4
 Australian Open women's singles: Angela Mortimer defeats Lorraine Coghlan 6–3 6–4
 Davis Cup: Australia is defeated by the United States 3–2 in the 1958 Davis Cup final
 Yachting
 Solo takes line honours and Siandra wins on handicap in the Sydney to Hobart Yacht Race

Births
 3 January – Kerry Armstrong, actress
 5 January – Penny Whetton, climatologist (died 2019)
 6 February – Simon Baker, race walker
 10 February – Phil Weightman, politician
 12 February – Grant McLennan, singer-songwriter and guitarist (died 2006) 
 14 February – Grant Thomas, Australian rules footballer
 15 February – Steve Bredhauer, politician
 22 February – Bill Feldman, politician
 28 February – Neil Bennett, politician
 16 March – Phillip Wilcher, pianist and composer
 20 March – Phil Anderson, cyclist
 29 March – Geoff Provest, politician
 11 April – Mark Furner, politician
 12 April
 Glenn Patching, swimmer
 Jim Madden, politician
 19 April – Bill Byrne, politician
 5 May – Robert DiPierdomenico, footballer and media personality
 7 May – Alan John, composer
 11 May – Peter Antonie, rower
 11 May – Phil Smyth, basketball player
 3 July – Gary Buckenara, Australian Rules footballer
 6 July – Gary Humphries, politician
 13 July – Richard Glover, journalist, author and radio personality
 15 July – Phil Gould, rugby league identity
 12 August – Grace Grace, politician
 22 August – Jo-Ann Miller, politician
 30 September – Rod Welford, politician
 October - Garry Pankhurst, former child actor
 13 October – Jim Krakouer, Australian Rules footballer
 22 October – Jan Jarratt, politician
 3 November – Ted Radke, politician
 15 November – Lewis Fitz-Gerald, actor and director
 24 November – Alex Douglas, politician
 26 November – Terry Rogers, politician
 27 November – Linda Lavarch, politician
 12 December – Monica Attard, journalist
 31 December – Geoff Marsh, cricketer

Deaths
 24 January – William Roy Hodgson, public servant (b. 1892)
 8 April – Ethel Turner, writer (b. 1872)
 15 May – Sir John Northmore, Western Australian Supreme Court Chief Justice (b. 1865)
 4 August – Ethel Anderson, poet, author, and painter (b. 1883)
 13 September – Russell Mockridge (b. 1928), cyclist
 14 October – Douglas Mawson, polar explorer (b. 1882)
 30 November – Hubert Wilkins, polar explorer (b. 1888)

See also
 List of Australian films of the 1950s

References

 
Australia
Years of the 20th century in Australia